Sunil Tatkare is an Indian Politician currently serving as Member of Parliament, Lok Sabha from Raigad. He was formerly served as the Member of Legislative Assembly, Maharashtra from Shrivardhan (Vidhan Sabha constituency) as Minister of Water Resources, Maharashtra. He formerly also served as the leader of Nationalist Congress Party in Vidhan Sabha. Tatkare has been alleged to have been associated in number of cases due to which the Anti-Corruption Bureau has sought the state government's nord to launch an "open inquiry" against him over allegations of land grab and disproportionate assets. Enforcement Directorate had started probe against him in assets case.

He was born in Sutarwadi Kolad on 10 July 1955 and studied up to Inter science from Ferguson college in Pune. He worked as government road contractor before joining Indian National Congress in 1984. In 1995 he became MLA on congress party's ticket.
He was made Minister of Food and Civil Supplies in 2004. In 2008, he was appointed Energy minister and in 2009 Finance Minister. His daughter Aditi Sunil Tatkare is a member of the Maharashtra Legislative Assembly.

References

Nationalist Congress Party politicians from Maharashtra
State cabinet ministers of Maharashtra
Marathi politicians
Maharashtra MLAs 2009–2014
1955 births
Living people
People from Raigad district
United Progressive Alliance candidates in the 2014 Indian general election